The Avia River is a tributary of the Miño River with a length of . It follows an SO-NL direction after arriving to the artificial lake of Albarellos, between the municipalities of Leiro, Boborás and Avión. After the artificial lake it continues until Boborás, turning there in SL direction. It flows in Ribadavia. Its tributaries include the Maquiáns River, Viñao River, and Arenteiro River, and it runs past the communities of  Boborás, Leiro, and Ribadavia.

See also 
 List of rivers of Spain
 Rivers of Galicia

Rivers of Spain
Rivers of Galicia (Spain)
Tributaries of the Minho (river)